Kirkbride was a stone and brick built railway station with a single platform on the Carlisle and Silloth Bay Railway on the Solway Plain in Cumbria, England.

The North British Railway leased the line and the station in 1862 and subsequently took it over in 1880. In 1923 the station became part of the London and North Eastern Railway and became part of British Railways after nationalisation in 1948. The station closed with the line on 7 September 1964.

The platform has been demolished, but in 2013 the station house still existed as a private residence.

References

External links 
 Photographs of the station
 The station on an Edwardian 6" OS map, via National Library of Scotland
 The station via Rail Maps Online

Disused railway stations in Cumbria
Former North British Railway stations
Railway stations in Great Britain opened in 1856
Railway stations in Great Britain closed in 1964
Beeching closures in England
1856 establishments in England